Northern Cemetery may refer to:

Denmark
 Jewish Northern Cemetery (Copenhagen)

Egypt
 Northern Cemetery (Cairo), a section of the City of the Dead
 Tombs of the Nobles (Amarna), sometimes referred to as the Northern Cemetery

Germany
 Nordfriedhof (disambiguation)
 Nordfriedhof (Cologne)
 Nordfriedhof (Dresden)
 Nordfriedhof (Leipzig)
 Nordfriedhof (Munich)
 Nordfriedhof (Munich U-Bahn)
 Alter Nordfriedhof (Munich)

New Zealand
 Dunedin Northern Cemetery, Dunedin

Sweden
 Norra begravningsplatsen, Stockholm

Russia
 Khovanskoye Northern Cemetery, Moscow

 Northern Cemetery, Rostov-on-Don

United Kingdom
 New Southgate Cemetery, formerly the Great Northern Cemetery, Brunswick Park, London
 Salford Northern Cemetery, former name of Agecroft Cemetery, in Pendlebury, Greater Manchester
 Northern Cemetery, Kingston upon Hull, Newland

United States
 Northern cemetery in Northern Township, Beltrami County, Minnesota